Csaba Hüttner (born January 20, 1971 in Budapest) is a Hungarian sprint canoer and marathon canoeist who competed from the mid-1990s to the mid-2000s. He won six medals at the ICF Canoe Sprint World Championships with four golds (C-4 500 m: 1997, 1998; C-4 1000 m: 1998, 2003), one silver (C-4 1000 m: 1995) and one bronze (C-4 500 m: 2003).

References

1971 births
Hungarian male canoeists
Living people
Canoeists from Budapest
ICF Canoe Sprint World Championships medalists in Canadian